Peggy R. Cook (July 8, 1939 – December 24, 2011) was a politician in Flint, Michigan.

Cook was a community organizer on the East side of Flint in its 4th Ward, where she involved in  neighborhood associations and starting neighborhood foot patrol.

In 1991, Cook was elected to the Flint City Council. She continue to get reelected and served until July 2003.  At that time, Flint Mayor Don Wiliamson appointed Cook as City Administrator.  In 2007, Cook was on extended sick leave for six months while a councilman, Scott Kincaid, question whether or not she had enough sick time accumulated.  The Flint City Benefit Manager indicated that a city ordinance allows for extended sick pay at 75% pay.  Her husband Bob was also serving as the City's director of parks and recreation.

In December 2007, Cook was replaced as Flint City Administrator,  only to return in March 2008 as governmental operations director replacing former State Senator Joe Conroy until Williamson resigned from office of the Mayor in 2009.

On December 24, 2011, Cook died at Genesys Regional Medical Center, Grand Blanc Twp. and was buried in Alabama.

References 

1939 births
2011 deaths
Burials in Alabama
Michigan city council members
Politicians from Flint, Michigan
Women city councillors in Michigan
20th-century American politicians
21st-century American politicians
20th-century American women politicians
21st-century American women politicians